Madison "Maddie" Desch (born August 25, 1997) is a retired American artistic gymnast who was a member of the gold medal winning US team at the 2014 World Artistic Gymnastics Championships and 2015 Pan American Games. She competed on the gymnastics team at the University of Alabama where she accepted a full athletic scholarship to study beginning in 2016.

Junior elite career

2011 
Desch's elite debut was at the 2011 CoverGirl Classic. She tied for third on vault and placed eighth on balance beam. She finished ninth in the all-around, and qualified for the Junior National Championships.

At the 2011 Junior Visa Championships, Desch placed tied for seventh on vault, nineteenth on bars, seventeenth on beam, and fifth on floor exercise. She was added to the Junior National Team.

2012 
At the start of the year, Desch competed at the City of Jesolo competition with teammates Katelyn Ohashi, Bailie Key, Lexie Priessman, and Amelia Hundley. The team won the gold medal, and Desch placed 5th in the all-around.

At the U.S. Secret Classic, she placed 2nd in the all-around behind Simone Biles.

At the Visa National Championships, Desch placed second in the all-around behind Lexie Priessman. She also became the balance beam junior national champion with a score of 29.150.

Senior elite career

2013 
Desch's senior debut was at the Secret US Classic. She only competed on balance beam, where she placed sixth.

At the P&G National Championships, she placed ninth in the all-around and fourth on floor exercise. However, she was not added back to the National team until the November training camp.

2014 
At the City of Jesolo Trophy, she contributed to the USA's gold medal finish, and placed eighth in the all-around.

Desch competed two events at the 2014 Secret U.S. Classic, finishing 13th.

In August and September, Desch competed at the Pan American Championships in Mississauga, Canada. She helped the American team place first in the team competition. Individually, she placed fifth in the all-around competition with a score of 54.900.

Desch was selected to compete at the  2014 World Championships in Nanning, China, but she was later named the alternate.

2015 
Desch competed at the 2015 City of Jesolo Trophy for the U.S. National team. On April 10, 2015, Desch announced that she was committed to the University of Alabama and their gymnastics team to do collegiate gymnastics.

On August 13, Desch competed at the P&G Championships where she competed on 3 events (not vault). She started on bars and scored a 13.100. She had a sub-par beam routine and scored a 13.850. On floor, she scored a 13.500. She withdrew from the remainder of the competition because of a back injury. However, Desch was invited to the Worlds training camp at the Karolyi Ranch.

On November 11, 2015, she signed the National Letter of Intent to the University of Alabama.

2016 
On May 29, 2016, Desch announced her retirement from elite gymnastics via her personal Instagram account, citing a persistent back injury. She said she would focus instead on preparing for her collegiate career at the University of Alabama.

NCAA career

2017 
In her freshman season at the University of Alabama, Desch was named to the Scholastic All-American, All-SEC, and SEC All-Freshman team and scored a 9.95 on both vault and floor during the regular season. Alabama advanced to the NCAA Championship final (Super Six), ultimately placing sixth.

2018 
In her sophomore season, Desch was named a Scholastic All-American and to the SEC Academic Honor Roll. Alabama again advanced to the NCAA Championships, but did not make the Super Six, after placing fifth in the semifinal. She matched her career-high 9.95 on floor against Arkansas in February 2018.

2019 
In her junior season, Desch earned All-SEC honors for the second time, and was named a Scholastic All-American and to the SEC Academic Honor Roll. She earned a 9.9 on floor exercise at the SEC Championships, where Alabama posted a season-high score in the first session.

References

 

Living people
1997 births
Alabama Crimson Tide women's gymnasts
American female artistic gymnasts
Sportspeople from Kansas City, Missouri
Sportspeople from Kansas
People from Lenexa, Kansas
Gymnasts at the 2015 Pan American Games
Pan American Games gold medalists for the United States
Pan American Games silver medalists for the United States
Pan American Games medalists in gymnastics
U.S. women's national team gymnasts
Medalists at the 2015 Pan American Games